Alonzo L. Hamby (born January 30, 1940) is an American historian and academic. He is distinguished professor of history emeritus at Ohio University and the recipient of  two National Endowment for the Humanities Fellowships, a Harry S. Truman Library Institute Senior Fellowship, a Woodrow Wilson International Center for Scholars Fellowship, and the Ohio Academy of History Distinguished Service Award.

He is an expert on Harry S. Truman and his presidency.

Life
Hamby was born on 30 January 1940.  He was born and raised at Humansville, Polk County, Missouri.

Career

Hamby completed his PhD from the University of Missouri.

He is distinguished professor of history emeritus at Ohio University.

Hamby is also a distinguished member of the American Historical Association.

Bibliography 

His books include:
 Liberalism and Its Challengers: From F.D.R. to Bush 
 Man of Destiny: FDR and the Making of the American Century 
 Man of the People: A Life of Harry S. Truman 
 For the Survival of Democracy: Franklin Roosevelt and the World Crisis of the 1930s 
 Beyond the New Deal: Harry S. Truman and American Liberalism 
 The Imperial Years 
 Harry S. Truman and the Fair Deal 
 The New Deal: Analysis & Interpretation

References

External links
 
 

21st-century American historians
21st-century American male writers
Living people
1940 births
University of Missouri alumni
Ohio University faculty
American male non-fiction writers